Chakaneh may refer to:
 Chakaneh-ye Olya
 Chakaneh-ye Sofla